Alfred Simonson House is a historic home located at Edwardsport, Knox County, Indiana.  It was built in 1873, and is a two-story, five bay, vernacular Greek Revival style brick I-house.  A single story ell connects to a merchant shop or summer kitchen.  It was the home of prominent merchant Alfred Simonson from its construction until his death in 1902.

It was added to the National Register of Historic Places in 2009.

References

I-houses in Indiana
Houses on the National Register of Historic Places in Indiana
Greek Revival houses in Indiana
Houses completed in 1873
Buildings and structures in Knox County, Indiana
National Register of Historic Places in Knox County, Indiana